Hertha may refer to:

Sports clubs
Hertha BSC, a German football club
Hertha Zehlendorf, a German football club 
CFC Hertha 06, a German sports club
ASV Hertha Wien, a defunct Austrian German football club
FC Hertha Wiesbach, a German football club

Other uses
Hertha (given name), a list of women with the name
A misreading of the name of the goddess Nerthus, a Germanic goddess
135 Hertha, an asteroid
Hertha Nunatak, a nunatak in Antarctica
SMS Hertha, a German Imperial Navy protected cruiser
Hertha (novel), a Swedish novel
Hertha (magazine), a Swedish women's magazine

See also
Herta (disambiguation)
Herthasee (disambiguation)